An election to Clare County Council took place on 5 June 2009 as part of that year's Irish local elections. 32 councillors were elected from six electoral divisions by PR-STV voting for a five-year term of office.

Results by party

Results by Electoral Area

Ennis East

Ennis West

Ennistymon

Killaloe

Kilrush

Shannon

External links
 Official website

2009 Irish local elections
2009